The Men's doubles Squash event at the 2018 Commonwealth Games was held at the Oxenford Studios, Gold Coast from 10 to 15 April.

Medalists

Seeds

Finals

Group stage

Pool A

Pool B

Pool C

Pool D

Pool E

Pool F

Pool G

Pool H

References

Squash at the 2018 Commonwealth Games